Ladoix-Serrigny is a commune in the Côte-d'Or department in eastern France.

Population

Wine

Ladoix-Serrigny is one of the wine communes of the Côte de Beaune, and the wines are usually labelled Ladoix, without the Serrigny part. The northeastern part of the Corton hill is in the commune, including some vineyards used to produce the Grand Cru wines Corton and Corton-Charlemagne. Some of the Premier Cru vineyards in Ladoix-Serrigny are part of the appellation of the neighboring village, and sold as Aloxe-Corton Premier Cru.

See also
Communes of the Côte-d'Or department

References

Communes of Côte-d'Or
Côte-d'Or communes articles needing translation from French Wikipedia